Wayne R. Monteith is a retired United States Air Force brigadier general who is the Associate Administrator for Commercial Space Transportation of the Federal Aviation Administration. In the U.S. Air Force, he last served as the Commander of the 45th Space Wing.

References

External links
 

Year of birth missing (living people)
Living people
Place of birth missing (living people)
United States Air Force generals
Federal Aviation Administration personnel